The 2012 Tennis Napoli Cup was a professional tennis tournament played on clay courts. It was the 16th edition of the tournament which was part of the 2012 ATP Challenger Tour. It took place in Naples, Italy between 23 and 29 April 2012.

ATP entrants

Seeds

 1 Rankings are as of April 16, 2012.

Other entrants
The following players received wildcards into the singles main draw:
  Marco Cecchinato
  Enrico Fioravante
  Federico Gaio
  Stefano Napolitano

The following players received entry from the qualifying draw:
  Riccardo Bellotti
  Adrien Bossel
  Roman Jebavý
  Mikhail Ledovskikh

Champions

Singles

 Andrey Kuznetsov def.  Jonathan Dasnières de Veigy, 7–6(8–6), 7–6(8–6)

Doubles

 Laurynas Grigelis /  Alessandro Motti def.  Rameez Junaid /  Igor Zelenay, 6–4, 6–4

External links
Official Website

Tennis Napoli Cup
Tennis Napoli Cup
2012 in Italian tennis